Elk Run Junction is an unincorporated community in Boone County, West Virginia, United States.

Climate
The climate in this area is characterized by hot, humid summers and generally mild to cool winters.  According to the Köppen Climate Classification system, Elk Run Junction has a humid subtropical climate, abbreviated "Cfa" on climate maps.

References 

Unincorporated communities in West Virginia
Unincorporated communities in Boone County, West Virginia